Zakaria Fati (born 6 September 1992) is a Moroccan professional footballer who plays as a winger for ASFAR.

Fati spent his early career in various semi-pro and pro clubs in Morocco. He played for Berrechid, Raja Beni Mellal, Khenifra, and Berkane before signing with ASFAR on 22 October 2020.

References

External links
 
 

1992 births
Living people
Moroccan footballers
Footballers from Casablanca
AS FAR (football) players
Botola players
Association football wingers
2020 African Nations Championship players
RS Berkane players